Stoney Indian Peaks are located in the Lewis Range, Glacier National Park in the U.S. state of Montana. Stoney Indian Lake is south of the peaks.

See also
 Mountains and mountain ranges of Glacier National Park (U.S.)

References

Stoney Indian Peaks
Stoney Indian Peaks
Lewis Range
Mountains of Montana